The Alma Trio was a classical piano trio established in 1942 at the Alma Estate of Yehudi Menuhin in Los Gatos, California.

Original members 

The original founding members of the Alma Trio were Roman Totenberg, violin; Gabor Rejto, cello; and Adolph Baller, piano. The members of the Trio had been encouraged by the famed artist, Yehudi Menuhin, to establish themselves as a professional piano trio. Adolph Baller had emigrated to the United States in 1938 with the sponsorship of Menuhin, following harrowing experiences at the hands of the Nazis in Austria and Germany. After arriving in the United States, Baller was a guest of Menuhin and became his regular collaborating pianist, as he had been earlier in Europe.

New violinists 
In 1953 Totenberg left the trio and was replaced by Maurice Wilk, who remained their violinist for ten years until his sudden death in Fall 1963. A review in The New York Times, December 1, 1954, had this to say:

Having acquired a new violinist in Maurice Wilk, the Alma Trio has taken a new lease on life. It deserves to be long and prosperous — that is, if the ensemble continues to play as beautifully as it played last night when it opened the cycle of three Beethoven concerts that it is giving at Town Hall ... few chamber ensembles play the Bonn master with such refinement of spirit and such subtlety of tonal shading.

Violinist Andor Toth joined the trio in the Spring of 1963. During the Fall of 1963, the Alma Trio made their first Russian tour. At the airport, Rejto was informed of a new rule that he would need a second ticket for his cello, and there were no remaining seats available. Faced with the impending cancellation of the tour, Rejto responded quickly, "But it is a bass balalaika." He was able to fly since that instrument was not listed by the airline.

New pianist 
This membership of the Alma Trio (Toth, Rejto, Baller) continued until Baller's retirement in 1971, when pianist William Corbett-Jones joined the trio until it disbanded in 1976. From 1982 to 1986 the trio resumed performing with Andor Toth, Gabor Rejto and Adolph Baller for a few concerts mainly in the northern California bay area. The original cellist "Gabby" Rejto died in 1987, and the original pianist "Usiu" Baller died in 1994. Andor Toth lived until 2006 when he died of a stroke in Los Angeles, California, at age 81.

References

External links
Altenberg Trio Ensemble database
Roman Totenberg
Gabor Rejto
Adolph Baller
Andor Toth
William Corbett Jones
 Note in an announcement of a recital by Baller

Past performances 
Online Archive of California
South Bay Chamber Music Society – The Early Concerts
Dallas, Texas Chamber Music Organization, Past Concerts
The Morrison Artist Series Past Seasons
Carmel Music Society Past Performances
Cape Town, South Africa Concert Series
Los Alamos, New Mexico Concert Association
Friends of Chamber Music, Stockton, California
  Buffalo Chamber Music Society 1967 and 1970  (PDF file)

Discography
The following Alma Trio recordings in LP format are cataloged by the Library of Congress. They are piano trios by Beethoven, Brahms, and Schubert.  
  Trio in E-flat major, op. 1, no. 1. Trio in B-flat, op. 11 Beethoven, Ludwig van, 1770–1827. | [1955?] | sound recording-musical | LC Control No.: 99572538]. Trio in B-flat, op. 11 Beethoven, Ludwig van, 1770-1827. | [1955?] | sound recording-musical | LC Control No.: 99572538
  Trio in C minor (No. 3, op. 1); Trio no. 11 (op. 121A) ten variations on "Ich bin der Schneider Kakadu." Beethoven, Ludwig van, 1770–1827. | [1955?] | sound recording-musical | LC Control No.: 99567526 
  Trio in D major for piano, violin, and cello, op. 70, no. 1 (Ghost). Trio in E-flat major for piano, violin, and cello, op. 70, no. 2. [Sound recording] Beethoven, Ludwig van, 1770–1827. | text | LC Control No.: r 62001425
  Trio in D major for piano, violin, and cello, op. 70, no. 1 (Ghost). Trio in E-flat major for piano, violin, and cello, op. 70, no. 2. [Sound recording] Beethoven, Ludwig van, 1770–1827. | text | LC Control No.: r 62001424
  Trio in E-flat major for piano, violin, and cello, op. 1, no. 1. [Sound recording] Beethoven, Ludwig van, 1770–1827. | text | LC Control No.: r 61001238
  Trio in C major for piano, violin, and cello, op. 87. [Sound recording] Brahms, Johannes, 1833–1897. | text | LC Control No.: r 61001239
  Trio in C major for piano, violin, and cello, op. 87. [Sound recording] Brahms, Johannes, 1833–1897. | text | LC Control No.: r 61001237
  Trio in E-flat major for piano, violin, and cello, op. 1, no. 1. [Sound recording] Beethoven, Ludwig van, 1770–1827. | text | LC Control No.: r 61001236
  Trio in E-flat major, op. 100 Schubert, Franz, 1797–1828. | [1948?] | sound recording-musical | LC Control No.: 2001564588
  Trio in B-flat major, for piano, violin, and cello, op. 97. [Sound recording] (Archduke) Beethoven, Ludwig van, 1770–1827. | text | LC Control No.: r 64001395
  Trio no. 2, in E-flat major, op. 100. [Sound recording] Schubert, Franz, 1797–1828. | text | LC Control No.: r 61001037
  Trio no. 2, in E-flat major, op. 100. [Sound recording] Schubert, Franz, 1797–1828. | text | LC Control No.: r 61001036
  Trio in B-flat major, for piano, violin, and cello, op. 97. [Sound recording] (Archduke) Beethoven, Ludwig van, 1770–1827. | text | LC Control No.: r 64001396
  Trio in E-flat major, op. 100. [Sound recording] Schubert, Franz, 1797–1828. | text | LC Control No.: 72765783

Piano trios
Chamber music groups
American classical music groups
Musical groups from the San Francisco Bay Area
Musical groups established in 1942
Musical groups disestablished in 1986
1942 establishments in California